The year 2010 was the 229th year of the Rattanakosin Kingdom of Thailand. It was the 64th year in the reign of King Bhumibol Adulyadej (Rama IX), and is reckoned as year 2553 in the Buddhist Era. The year saw large anti-government protests which led to a violent military crackdown in May.

Incumbents
King: Bhumibol Adulyadej 
Crown Prince: Vajiralongkorn
Prime Minister: Abhisit Vejjajiva
Supreme Patriarch: Nyanasamvara Suvaddhana

Births

January

February

March
Miss Thailand Universe 2010 was held in Bangkok on March 20.Fonthip Watcharatrakul was the winner.

April

May
2010 Thai military crackdown ended on May 19. There were 87 reported deaths and at least 2,000 injuries, 51 missing civilians as of 8 June.

June

July

August

September

October

November

December

Births

Deaths

See also
 2010 Thai Premier League
 2010 Thai Division 1 League
 2010 floods in Thailand and north Malaysia
 2010 in Thai football
 Thailand at the 2010 Asian Games
 2010 in Thai television
 List of Thai films of 2010

References

External links
Year 2010 Calendar - Thailand

 
Years of the 21st century in Thailand
Thailand